Pseudophilautus reticulatus, known as reticulated-thigh shrub frog, is a species of frog in the family Rhacophoridae.
It is endemic to Sri Lanka.

Its natural habitat is subtropical or tropical moist lowland forests.
It is threatened by habitat loss.

References

reticulatus
Frogs of Sri Lanka
Endemic fauna of Sri Lanka
Amphibians described in 1869
Taxa named by Albert Günther
Taxonomy articles created by Polbot